The Leyenda de Plata (2006) was professional wrestling tournament produced by the Mexican wrestling promotion Consejo Mundial de Lucha Libre (CMLLl; Spanish "World Wrestling Council") that ran from August 25, 2006 over the course of four of CMLL's Friday night shows in Arena México with the finals on September 15, 2006. The annual Leyenda de Plata tournament is held in honor of lucha libre legend El Santo and is one of CMLL's most important annual tournaments.

The torneo cibernetico elimination match saw Black Warrior eliminate Rey Bucanero as the last man in a match that also included Heavy Metal, Metro, La Máscara, Último Guerrero, Mephisto and Misterioso Jr. With Black Warrior winning the first cibernetico it was not too surprising that Místico won the second cibernetico as the two had been involved with a long-running storyline feud throughout 2006. Místico outlasted Mr. Águila, Negro Casas, El Sagrado, Volador Jr., Averno and Alex Koslov. The semi-final on September 8, 2006, saw Místico defeat Black Warrior, followed by a "mask vs. mask", Luchas de Apuesta challenge from Black Warrior that Místico accepted for the CMLL 73rd Anniversary Show. On September 15, 2006 Místico defeated Atlantis to win the Leyeda de Plata, overcoming interference from Atlantis' corner-man Black Warrior. After the match Black Warrior stole the Leyenda de Plata trophy and ran off with it, furthering their feud.

Production

Background
The Leyenda de Plata (Spanish for "the Silver Legend") is an annual lucha libre tournament scripted and promoted by the Mexican professional wrestling promotion Consejo Mundial de Lucha Libre (CMLL).  The first Leyenda de Plata was held in 1998 and was in honor of El Santo, nicknamed Enmáscarado de Plata (the Silver mask) from which the tournament got its name. The trophy given to the winner is a plaque with a metal replica of the mask that El Santo wore in both wrestling and lucha films.

The Leyenda de Plata was held annually until 2003, at which point El Santo's son, El Hijo del Santo left CMLL on bad terms. The tournament returned in 2004 and has been held on an almost annual basis since then. The original format of the tournament was the Torneo cibernetico elimination match to qualify for a semi-final. The winner of the semi-final would face the winner of the previous year's tournament in the final. Since 2005 CMLL has held two cibernetico matches and the winner of each then meet in the semi-final. In 2011, the tournament was modified to eliminate the final stage as the previous winner, Místico, did not work for CMLL at that point in time The 2006 edition of La Leyenda de Plata was the eighth overall tournament held by CMLL.

Storylines
The events featured a total of number of professional wrestling matches with different wrestlers involved in pre-existing scripted feuds, plots and storylines. Wrestlers were portrayed as either heels (referred to as rudos in Mexico, those that portray the "bad guys") or faces (técnicos in Mexico, the "good guy" characters) as they followed a series of tension-building events, which culminated in a wrestling match or series of matches.

Tournament overview

Cibernetico 1

Cibernetico 2

Results

August 25, 2006

September 1, 2006

September 8, 2006

September 15, 2006

References

2006 in professional wrestling
Leyenda de Plata
Events in Mexico City
September 2006 events in Mexico